Deadbeat, deadbeats or dead-beat may refer to:
Deadbeat escapement, a type of escapement used in pendulum clocks
Dead-beat control, a problem in discrete control theory of finding an optimal input sequence that will bring the system output to a given setpoint in a finite number of time steps
Deadbeat parent, pejorative term referring to parents who do not fulfill their parental responsibilities
 Dead Beat, a 1992 novel by Val McDermid
Dead Beat (The Dresden Files), a 2005 book of the Dresden Files series by Jim Butcher

Film and television
Deadbeats, a 1977 film, starring Chris Mulkey
Dead Beat, a 1994 film based on the life of real-life serial killer Charles Schmid
Deadbeat (TV series), a 2014 Hulu original TV series

Music
Deadbeat, the stage name of Canadian electronica musician Scott Montieth
The Deadbeats, an art punk band formed in 1977 in Los Angeles, California
Uncle Acid & the Deadbeats, an English rock band formed in 2009
Deadbeats, a record label launched by Canadian electronic music duo Zeds Dead
Deadbeat Club, a song by the B-52's from their 1989 album Cosmic Thing
"Dead-Beat", a song by King Gizzard & the Lizard Wizard from the 2011 EP Willoughby's Beach

See also